Kathleen Corrigan (born March 3, 1945) is an American gymnast. She competed in six events at the 1964 Summer Olympics.

References

External links
 

1945 births
Living people
American female artistic gymnasts
Olympic gymnasts of the United States
Gymnasts at the 1964 Summer Olympics
Sportspeople from Quincy, Massachusetts
Pan American Games medalists in gymnastics
Pan American Games gold medalists for the United States
Pan American Games silver medalists for the United States
Pan American Games bronze medalists for the United States
Gymnasts at the 1963 Pan American Games
Medalists at the 1963 Pan American Games
20th-century American women